Florian Klein (born 17 November 1986) is an Austrian professional footballer who plays as a defender.

Club career
Klein began his career in September 1994 in the youth team of LASK Linz and was promoted to the senior team in July 2004. He played on loan for FC Blau-Weiß Linz in the 2003–04 season and returned to Linz after the end of the season. After 163 games in 14 years for the club, in which he scored 13 goals, Klein signed a two-year contract with Austria Wien on 30 April 2009. In 2012, he joined Red Bull Salzburg.

After the end of his contract with Salzburg on 1 July 2014, Klein moved to VfB Stuttgart on a free transfer. On 6 May 2014, he signed a contract until June 2017 with the club.

He returned to Austria Wien on 23 August 2017.

International career
Klein has played for Austria under-19 and Austria under-21. On 19 May 2010, Klein made his debut for the Austria against Croatia.

He represented the national team at 2016 UEFA Euro.

Career statistics

Honours
Red Bull Salzburg
 Austrian Bundesliga: 2013–14
 Austrian Cup: 2013–14

References

1986 births
Living people
Association football defenders
Austrian footballers
Austria international footballers
Austrian expatriate footballers
Austrian Football Bundesliga players
Bundesliga players
2. Bundesliga players
LASK players
FK Austria Wien players
FC Red Bull Salzburg players
VfB Stuttgart players
Expatriate footballers in Germany
UEFA Euro 2016 players
Footballers from Linz
Austrian expatriate sportspeople in Germany